Charles Georges Van Antwerpen (10 June 1925 – 12 December 2019) was a Belgian rower. He competed at the 1948 Summer Olympics in London with the men's coxless pair where they were eliminated in the round one repechage.

References

1925 births
2019 deaths
Belgian male rowers
Olympic rowers of Belgium
Rowers at the 1948 Summer Olympics
Rowers at the 1952 Summer Olympics
Sportspeople from Antwerp
European Rowing Championships medalists
20th-century Belgian people